Luis Manuel Arias Vega (born 29 March 1967), known as Luis Manuel, is a Spanish retired footballer who played as a central defender.

He played 195 La Liga matches over nine seasons, with Oviedo and Salamanca.

Club career
Born in Oviedo, Asturias, Luis Manuel spent most of his career with local Real Oviedo, playing nine full seasons with the first team and seven in La Liga. His debut in the competition came on 3 September 1988, in a 1–0 home win against Real Sociedad.

Luis Manuel played once in the UEFA Cup with his main club, the 1–0 home victory over Genoa C.F.C. for the 1991–92 edition (2–3 aggregate loss). He left in 1995, going on to represent at the professional level UD Salamanca and CD Toledo – the former side also in the top tier – and retiring for good in 2003 at the age of 36.

In the summer of 2004, Luis Manuel returned to Oviedo, being appointed director of football.

International career
Luis Manuel earned four caps for Spain, in slightly more than two years. His debut came on 13 December 1989 in a friendly with Switzerland, coming on as a second-half substitute for Genar Andrinúa in the 2–1 win in Santa Cruz de Tenerife.

References

External links

1967 births
Living people
Footballers from Oviedo
Spanish footballers
Association football defenders
La Liga players
Segunda División players
Segunda División B players
Tercera División players
Real Oviedo Vetusta players
Real Oviedo players
UD Salamanca players
CD Toledo players
SD Ponferradina players
Águilas CF players
Spain under-21 international footballers
Spain international footballers